The 2014 FIM Moto3 World Championship was a part of the 66th F.I.M. Road Racing World Championship season. Maverick Viñales was the reigning series champion, but did not contest the season as he moved to the series' intermediate class, Moto2.

The riders' championship was not settled until the final round of the season, and was won by Estrella Galicia 0,0 rider Álex Márquez, the brother of  125cc champion Marc Márquez; as a result, the Márquez brothers became the first siblings to each win a Grand Prix motorcycle racing title. Márquez – a three-time race winner – prevailed after a third-place finish in Valencia, which was good enough to give him the title by two points over Jack Miller, who won the race. Miller, who had not finished on a Grand Prix podium prior to the 2014 season, achieved six victories and ten podium finishes, riding for the Ajo Motorsport team. Third place in the championship was also decided in Valencia, with Álex Rins, teammate to Márquez at the Estrella Galicia 0,0 team, able to take the position ahead of SaxoPrint–RTG's Efrén Vázquez. Both riders took two victories during the season, including the first two of Vázquez's Grand Prix career.

The only other riders to take victories during the season were the riders that finished fifth and sixth in the final riders' championship standings. Riding for Valentino Rossi's Sky Racing Team by VR46, Romano Fenati took four victories during the season, but with only two further podium finishes, he was unable to mount a substantial championship challenge. Alexis Masbou, riding for Ongetta–Rivacold, was also a first-time Grand Prix winner during the 2014 season; he won at Brno, after prevailing in a 17-rider lead battle. The rookie of the year standings were comfortably won by Enea Bastianini of the Junior Team GO&FUN Moto3. Bastianini finished ninth overall having graduated from the Red Bull MotoGP Rookies Cup, taking three podium finishes during the campaign. In the constructors' championship, KTM and Honda finished tied on 384 points, but KTM won the title – a third consecutive title – on countback as the marque had won 10 races to Honda's 8.

Calendar
The Fédération Internationale de Motocyclisme released a 19-race provisional calendar on 2 October 2013. The calendar was updated on 13 December 2013 and again on 24 February 2014, resulting in an 18-race calendar.

The 2014 calendar originally saw the addition of two South American races, the series' first visit to the continent since 2004. A race in Argentina at the newly upgraded Autódromo Termas de Río Hondo is scheduled for 27 April and a race in Brazil at the Autódromo Internacional Nelson Piquet in Brasilia was scheduled for 28 September, but the latter was subsequently removed from the calendar. The round at Motorland Aragón was also moved back a week, filling the date originally scheduled for Brazil.

 ‡ = Night race
 †† = Saturday race

Teams and riders
A provisional entry list was released by the Fédération Internationale de Motocyclisme on 20 November 2013. An updated entry list was released on 14 January 2014. The final entry list was released on 28 February 2014. All teams used Dunlop tyres.

Results and standings

Grands Prix

Riders' standings
Scoring system
Points were awarded to the top fifteen finishers. A rider had to finish the race to earn points.

Constructors' standings
Points were awarded to the top fifteen finishers. A rider had to finish the race to earn points.

 Each constructor got the same number of points as their best placed rider in each race.

Although KTM and Honda finished with identical points totals of 384, KTM was crowned manufacturers' champion on countback by virtue of their 10 race wins to Honda's 8.

References

External links
 The official website of Grand Prix motorcycle racing

Moto3
Grand Prix motorcycle racing seasons